Andrew Rowland Hill (born 20 January 1965) is an English former professional footballer who played as a defender. In a 15-year career he scored 19 goals in 551 league and cup appearances in the Football League and Premier League.

He began his career as a youth-team player at Manchester United and played on the losing side in the 1982 FA Youth Cup final. He never made a first-team appearance however, and moved on to Bury in July 1984. He was named as Bury's Player of the Year after helping the club to secure promotion out of the Fourth Division in the 1984–85 season. He spent close to seven years at Bury, making 312 appearances, before he was sold to Manchester City for £200,000 in 1990. He played for City for close to five seasons, including the opening season of the Premier League, before being sold on to Port Vale for £150,000 in August 1995. He played on the losing side in the 1996 Anglo-Italian Cup final and retired in May 1998.

Playing career

Manchester United
Hill was born in Maltby, Yorkshire. Upon leaving school in 1981, he began an apprenticeship at Manchester United. He played in the youth side that finished as FA Youth Cup runners-up to Watford in 1982, his teammates included Clayton Blackmore, Mark Hughes and Norman Whiteside. He also gained England Youth Honours. He later signed as a professional but never got a first team game at Old Trafford and signed for Fourth Division club Bury in July 1984.

Bury
The "Shakers" secured the fourth and final automatic promotion place in 1984–85, and Hill was voted the club's Player of the Year. Hill was then appointed as captain by manager Martin Dobson, at the age of 19. Bury finished three points above the Third Division drop zone in 1985–86. They then finished comfortably in mid-table in 1986–87, 1987–88, and 1988–89. Sam Ellis then took over as manager, and led the club to the play-offs with a fifth-place finish in 1989–90 – they were then beaten by Tranmere Rovers at the semi-final stage. The following season under new boss Mike Walsh he was sold to Manchester City. Hill played a total of 317 matches and scored 12 goals for the Gigg Lane club.

Manchester City
Hill signed for Manchester City in a £200,000 deal in 1990 who were flying high in the First Division eventually finishing fifth under Peter Reid's stewardship. The "Sky Blues" again finished fifth in 1991–92, with Hill scoring a career-high of four goals in his 41 appearances. He started 23 Premier League games in 1992–93, as the Maine Road club posted a ninth-place finish. The club slipped down the table under new boss Brian Horton with Hill missing large chunks of the Horton tenure due to injury. Hill was recommended for a new contract by Horton in May 1995 however Hill rejected chairman Francis Lee's offer of a new two-year deal.

Port Vale
In August 1995, Hill joined John Rudge's First Division Port Vale for a £150,000 fee. He made his debut in a 1–0 win over Potteries derby rivals Stoke City at the Victoria Ground on 27 August. He later featured in the FA Cup fourth round giant killing over cup holders Everton, At the end of the 1995–96 season he played in the 1996 Anglo-Italian Cup final, as Vale lost 5–2 to Genoa. He made 43 appearances in 1996–97, as the "Valiants" made their highest post-war finish. He played 31 games at Vale Park in the 1997–98 season, before announcing his retirement in May 1998.

Coaching career
After retiring Hill went into coaching where he has worked for Bury as the Head of Youth Development, the Academy Director at Nevada Wonders Soccer Academy and then developed his own successful football academy Pro-Vision North West, based in the Greater Manchester area. He was later appointed head of development at Bacup Borough. However he resigned from his role after being diagnosed with Spinal stenosis.

Career statistics
Source:

Honours
Individual
Bury F.C. Player of the Year: 1984–85

Manchester United
FA Youth Cup runner-up: 1982

Bury
Football League Fourth Division fourth-place promotion: 1984–85

Port Vale
Anglo-Italian Cup runner-up: 1996

References

1965 births
Living people
People from Maltby, South Yorkshire
Footballers from Yorkshire
English footballers
Association football defenders
Manchester United F.C. players
Bury F.C. players
Manchester City F.C. players
Port Vale F.C. players
Premier League players
English Football League players
Association football coaches
Bury F.C. non-playing staff